Krzysztof Wierzbowski (born July 18, 1988) is a Polish volleyball player.

Career

Clubs
He went to Lotos Trefl Gdańsk in June 2013. He signed a two-year contract. On April 19, 2015 Lotos Trefl Gdańsk, including him, achieved the Polish Cup 2015. Then he won silver medal of the Polish Championship. After two seasons he left Lotos Trefl Gdańsk in May 2015.

National team
He won a silver medal at the Universiade 2013.

Sporting achievements

Clubs

CEV Challenge Cup
  2011/2012 - with AZS Politechnika Warszawska

National championships
 2007/2008  Polish Cup, with AZS Częstochowa
 2007/2008  Polish Championship, with AZS Częstochowa
 2014/2015  Polish Cup, with Lotos Trefl Gdańsk
 2014/2015  Polish Championship, with Lotos Trefl Gdańsk

References

External links
 PlusLiga player profile
 Lotos Trefl Gdańsk player profile

1988 births
Living people
Volleyball players from Warsaw
Sportspeople from Masovian Voivodeship
Polish men's volleyball players
AZS Częstochowa players
Projekt Warsaw players
Trefl Gdańsk players
Effector Kielce players
Universiade medalists in volleyball
Universiade silver medalists for Poland
Medalists at the 2013 Summer Universiade